Liwa may refer to:

Places

 Chad
Liwa (sub-prefecture) in Mamdi Department

 Indonesia
Liwa, Indonesia

 Oman
Liwa, Oman, place in Oman, area around Sohar University
Liwa Province, Oman (wilayah)

 Poland
Liwa, Warmian-Masurian Voivodeship, a village in northern Poland
Liwa (river), a river in Poland

 United Arab Emirates
Liwa Oasis, Abu Dhabi

People
 Zofia Gomułkowa, born Liwa Szoken
 Tom Liwa

Other uses
Liwa (Arabic), meaning district, banner, or a military rank
Liwa (music), traditional dance in UAE
Liwa Chemicals, chemicals company in UAE
Al Liwaa, daily newspaper in Lebanon
Long Island Wrestling Association, LIWA
Sanjak, an administrative division of the Ottoman Empire also called a Liwa